Islamic art is a part of Islamic culture and encompasses the visual arts produced since the 7th century CE by people who lived within territories inhabited or ruled by Muslim populations. Referring to characteristic traditions across a wide range of lands, periods, and genres, Islamic art is a concept used first by Western art historians since the late 19th century. Public Islamic art is traditionally non-representational, except for the widespread use of plant forms, usually in varieties of the spiralling arabesque. These are often combined with Islamic calligraphy, geometric patterns in styles that are typically found in a wide variety of media, from small objects in ceramic or metalwork to large decorative schemes in tiling on the outside and inside of large buildings, including mosques. Other forms of Islamic art include Islamic miniature painting, artefacts like Islamic glass or pottery, and textile arts, such as carpets and embroidery.

The early developments of Islamic art were influenced by Roman art, Early Christian art (particularly Byzantine art), and Sassanian art, with later influences from Central Asian nomadic traditions. Chinese art had a significant influence on Islamic painting, pottery, and textiles. From its beginnings, Islamic art has been based on the written version of the Quran and other seminal religious works, which is reflected by the important role of calligraphy, representing the word as the medium of divine revelation.

Religious Islamic art has been typically characterized by the absence of figures and extensive use of calligraphic, geometric and abstract floral patterns. In secular art of the Muslim world, representations of human and animal forms historically flourished in nearly all Islamic cultures, although, partly because of opposing religious sentiments, living beings in paintings were often stylized, giving rise to a variety of decorative figural designs.

Both religious and secular art objects often exhibit the same references, styles and forms. These include calligraphy, architecture, textiles and furnishings, such as carpets and woodwork. Secular arts and crafts include the production of textiles, such as clothing, carpets or tents, as well as household objects, made from metal, wood or other materials. Further, figurative miniature paintings have a rich tradition, especially in Persian, Mughal and Ottoman painting. These pictures were often meant to illustrate well-known historical or poetic stories. Some interpretations of Islam, however, include a ban of depiction of animate beings, also known as aniconism. Islamic aniconism stems in part from the prohibition of idolatry and in part from the belief that creation of living forms is God's prerogative.

Terminology 
Although the concept of "Islamic art" has been put into question by some modern art historians as a construct of Western cultural views, the similarities between art produced at widely different times and places in the Muslim world, especially in the Islamic Golden Age, have been sufficient to keep the term in wide use as a useful classification since the late 19th century. Scholars such as Jacelyn K. Kerner have drawn attention to its wide-ranging scope referring to more than 40 nations and to the growing public interest both in Western as well as, more recently, in Muslim societies. Further, the List of Islamic museums bears witness to this art historical term having found wide acceptance.

The Encyclopædia Britannica defines "Islamic arts" as including visual arts, literature, performing arts and music that "virtually defies any comprehensive definition". In a strict sense, the term might only refer to artistic manifestations that are closely related to religious practice. Most often, however, it is meant to include "all of the arts produced by Muslim peoples, whether connected with their religion or not."

Calligraphy 

Calligraphic design is omnipresent in Islamic art, where, as in Europe in the Middle Ages, religious exhortations, including Qur'anic verses, may be included in secular objects, especially coins, tiles and metalwork, and most painted miniatures include some script, as do many buildings. Use of Islamic calligraphy in architecture extended significantly outside of Islamic territories; one notable example is the use of Chinese calligraphy of Arabic verses from the Qur'an in the Great Mosque of Xi'an. Other inscriptions include verses of poetry, and inscriptions recording ownership or donation. Two of the main scripts involved are the symbolic kufic and naskh scripts, which can be found adorning and enhancing the visual appeal of the walls and domes of buildings, the sides of minbars, and metalwork. Islamic calligraphy in the form of painting or sculptures is sometimes referred to as Quranic art.

The various forms of traditional Arabic calligraphy and decoration of the manuscripts used for written versions of the Qur'an represent a central tradition of Islamic visual art. The arabesque is often used to symbolize the transcendent, indivisible and infinite nature of God. Mistakes in repetitions may be intentionally introduced as a show of humility by artists who believe only God can produce perfection, although this theory has also been disputed.

East Persian pottery from the 9th to 11th centuries, decorated only with highly stylised inscriptions and called "epigraphic ware", has been described as "probably the most refined and sensitive of all Persian pottery". Large inscriptions made from tiles, sometimes with the letters raised in relief, or the background cut away, are found on the interiors and exteriors of many important buildings. Complex carved calligraphy also decorates buildings. For most of the Islamic period the majority of coins only showed lettering, which are often very elegant despite their small size and nature of production. The tughra or monogram of an Ottoman sultan was used extensively on official documents, with very elaborate decoration for important ones. Other single sheets of calligraphy, designed for albums, might contain short poems, Qur'anic verses, or other texts.

The main languages, all using Arabic script, are Arabic, always used for Qur'anic verses, Persian in the Persianate world, especially for poetry, and Turkish, with Urdu appearing in later centuries. Calligraphers usually had a higher status than other artists.

Painting 

While not condemned in the Quran, making images of human beings and animals is frowned upon in many Islamic cultures and connected with laws against idolatry common to all Abrahamic religions. Abdullaah ibn Mas'ood reported Muhammad said, "Those who will be most severely punished by Allah on the Day of Resurrection will be the image-makers" (reported by al-Bukhaari). However, this rule has been interpreted in different ways by different scholars and in different historical periods, and there are examples of paintings of both animals and humans in Mughal, Persian, and Turkish art. Siyah Qalam (Black Pen), frequently depicts demonic creatures (div) from Islamic narratives, but seem of Central Asian origin. The existence of this aversion to creating images of animate beings has been used to explain the prevalence of calligraphy, tessellation, and pattern as key aspects of Islamic artistic culture.

Although there has been a tradition of wall-paintings, especially in the Persianate world, the best-surviving and highest developed form of painting in the Islamic world is the miniature in illuminated manuscripts, or later as a single page for inclusion in a muraqqa or bound album of miniatures and calligraphy. The tradition of the Persian miniature has been dominant since about the 13th century, strongly influencing the Ottoman miniature of Turkey and the Mughal miniature in India. Miniatures were especially an art of the court, and because they were not seen in public, it has been argued that constraints on the depiction of the human figure were much more relaxed, and indeed miniatures often contain great numbers of small figures, and from the 16th century portraits of single ones. Although surviving early examples are now uncommon, human figurative art was a continuous tradition in Islamic lands in secular contexts, notably several of the Umayyad Desert Castles (c. 660–750), and during the Abbasid Caliphate (c. 749–1258).

The largest commissions of illustrated books were usually classics of Persian poetry such as the epic Shahnameh, although the Mughals and Ottomans both produced lavish manuscripts of more recent history with the autobiographies of the Mughal emperors, and more purely military chronicles of Turkish conquests. Portraits of rulers developed in the 16th century, and later in Persia, then becoming very popular. Mughal portraits, normally in profile, are very finely drawn in a realist style, while the best Ottoman ones are vigorously stylized. Album miniatures typically featured picnic scenes, portraits of individuals or (in India especially) animals, or idealized youthful beauties of either sex.

Chinese influences included the early adoption of the vertical format natural to a book, which led to the development of a birds-eye view where a very carefully depicted background of hilly landscape or palace buildings rises up to leave only a small area of sky. The figures are arranged in different planes on the background, with recession (distance from the viewer) indicated by placing more distant figures higher up in the space, but at essentially the same size. The colours, which are often very well preserved, are strongly contrasting, bright and clear. The tradition reached a climax in the 16th and early 17th centuries, but continued until the early 19th century, and has been revived in the 20th.

Since the mid-20th century following the departure of the Dutch colonialists, several Indonesian painters combined Abstract Expressionism with geometric forms, Indonesian symbols and Islamic calligraphy, creating religiously influenced Abstract Art. The spiritual centre of this movement is the Bandung Institute of Technology (ITB), with leading teachers such as A.D. Pirous, Ahmad Sadali, Mochtar Apin and Umi Dachlan as their main representatives.

Rugs and carpets 

No Islamic artistic product has become better known outside the Islamic world than the pile carpet, more commonly referred to as the Oriental carpet (oriental rug). Their versatility is utilized in everyday Islamic and Muslim life, from floor coverings to architectural enrichment, from cushions to bolsters to bags and sacks of all shapes and sizes, and to religious objects (such as a prayer rug, which would provide a clean place to pray). They have been a major export to other areas since the late Middle Ages, used to cover not only floors but tables, for long a widespread European practice that is now common only in the Netherlands. Carpet weaving is a rich and deeply embedded tradition in Islamic societies, and the practice is seen in large city factories as well as in rural communities and nomadic encampments. In earlier periods, special establishments and workshops were in existence that functioned directly under court patronage.

Very early Islamic carpets, i.e. those before the 16th century, are extremely rare. More have survived in the West and oriental carpets in Renaissance painting from Europe are a major source of information on them, as they were valuable imports that were painted accurately. The most natural and easy designs for a carpet weaver to produce consist of straight lines and edges, and the earliest Islamic carpets to survive or be shown in paintings have geometric designs, or centre on very stylized animals, made up in this way. Since the flowing loops and curves of the arabesque are central to Islamic art, the interaction and tension between these two styles was long a major feature of carpet design.

There are a few survivals of the grand Egyptian 16th century carpets, including one almost as good as new discovered in the attic of the Pitti Palace in Florence, whose complex patterns of octagon roundels and stars, in just a few colours, shimmer before the viewer. Production of this style of carpet began under the Mamluks but continued after the Ottomans conquered Egypt. The other sophisticated tradition was the Persian carpet which reached its peak in the 16th and early 17th century in works like the Ardabil Carpet and Coronation Carpet; during this century the Ottoman and Mughal courts also began to sponsor the making in their domains of large formal carpets, evidently with the involvement of designers used to the latest court style in the general Persian tradition. These use a design style shared with non-figurative Islamic illumination and other media, often with a large central gul motif, and always with wide and strongly demarcated borders. The grand designs of the workshops patronized by the court spread out to smaller carpets for the merely wealthy and for export, and designs close to those of the 16th and 17th centuries are still produced in large numbers today.  The description of older carpets has tended to use the names of carpet-making centres as labels, but often derived from the design rather than any actual evidence that they originated from around that centre. Research has clarified that designs were by no means always restricted to the centre they are traditionally associated with, and the origin of many carpets remains unclear.

As well as the major Persian, Turkish and Arab centres, carpets were also made across Central Asia, in India, and in Spain and the Balkans. Spanish carpets, which sometimes interrupted typical Islamic patterns to include coats of arms, enjoyed high prestige in Europe, being commissioned by royalty and for the Papal Palace, Avignon, and the industry continued after the Reconquista. Armenian carpet-weaving is mentioned by many early sources, and may account for a much larger proportion of East Turkish and Caucasian production than traditionally thought. The Berber carpets of North Africa have a distinct design tradition. Apart from the products of city workshops, in touch with trading networks that might carry the carpets to markets far away, there was also a large and widespread village and nomadic industry producing work that stayed closer to traditional local designs. As well as pile carpets, kelims and other types of flat-weave or embroidered textiles were produced, for use on both floors and walls. Figurative designs, sometimes with large human figures, are very popular in Islamic countries but relatively rarely exported to the West, where abstract designs are generally what the market expects.

Architecture

Columns 
Early Islamic columns followed the style seen in the classic period of the Mediterranean. Classic columns can be seen in earlier mosques such as the Great Mosque of Damascus and Córdoba. These columns can vary in form from being completely smooth, and having vertical or twisting fluting. In the 7th and 8th century, the Mosque of the Prophet Medina, was rebuilt using a style known as hypostyle. Hypostyle mosques usually entail multiple columns that support a smooth and even wall. In India, traditionally Indian stone columns of different shapes such a circles, squares and octagons, were incorporated into some mosques. Finally, engaged columns were introduced into decorate Islamic buildings.

Arches 

Islamic arches, similar to columns, followed a style similar to Roman architecture. Arches became quite prominent to Islamic architecture during the 8th-10th centuries. There are three distinct shapes of Islamic arches which include horseshoe, keel, and polylobuled. However, in ancient India, Islamic arches take shape after being pointed, lobed, or ogee.

Ceramics 

Islamic art has very notable achievements in ceramics, both in pottery and tiles for walls, which in the absence of wall-paintings were taken to heights unmatched by other cultures. Early pottery is often unglazed, but tin-opacified glazing was one of the earliest new technologies developed by the Islamic potters. The first Islamic opaque glazes can be found as blue-painted ware in Basra, dating to around the 8th century. Another significant contribution was the development of stonepaste ceramics, originating from 9th century Iraq. The first industrial complex for glass and pottery production was built in Raqqa, Syria, in the 8th century. Other centers for innovative pottery in the Islamic world included Fustat (from 975 to 1075), Damascus (from 1100 to around 1600) and Tabriz (from 1470 to 1550).  Lusterwares with iridescent colours may have continued pre-Islamic Roman and Byzantine techniques, but were either invented or considerably developed on pottery and glass in Persia and Syria from the 9th century onwards.

Islamic pottery was often influenced by Chinese ceramics, whose achievements were greatly admired and emulated. This was especially the case in the periods after the Mongol invasions and those of the Timurids. Techniques, shapes and decorative motifs were all affected. Until the Early Modern period Western ceramics had very little influence, but Islamic pottery was very sought after in Europe, and often copied. An example of this is the albarello, a type of maiolica earthenware jar originally designed to hold apothecaries' ointments and dry drugs. The development of this type of pharmacy jar had its roots in the Islamic Middle East. Hispano-Moresque examples were exported to Italy, stimulating the earliest Italian examples, from 15th century Florence.

The Hispano-Moresque style emerged in Al-Andaluz or Muslim Spain in the 8th century, under Egyptian influence, but most of the best production was much later, by potters presumed to have been largely Muslim but working in areas reconquered by the Christian kingdoms. It mixed Islamic and European elements in its designs, and much was exported across neighbouring European countries. It had introduced two ceramic techniques to Europe: glazing with an opaque white tin-glaze, and painting in metallic lusters. Ottoman İznik pottery produced most of the best work in the 16th century, in tiles and large vessels boldly decorated with floral motifs influenced, once again, by Chinese Yuan and Ming ceramics.  These were still in earthenware; there was no porcelain made in Islamic countries until modern times, though Chinese porcelain was imported and admired.

The medieval Islamic world also had pottery with painted animal and human imagery. Examples are found throughout the medieval Islamic world, particularly in Persia and Egypt.

Tiling

The earliest grand Islamic buildings, like the Dome of the Rock in Jerusalem, had interior walls decorated with mosaics in the Byzantine style, but without human figures. From the 9th century onwards the distinctive Islamic tradition of glazed and brightly coloured tiling for interior and exterior walls and domes developed. Some earlier schemes create designs using mixtures of tiles each of a single colour that are either cut to shape or are small and of a few shapes, used to create abstract geometric patterns.  Later large painted schemes use tiles painted before firing with a part of the scheme – a technique requiring confidence in the consistent results of firing.

Some elements, especially the letters of inscriptions, may be moulded in three-dimensional relief, and in especially in Persia certain tiles in a design may have figurative painting of animals or single human figures. These were often part of designs mostly made up of tiles in plain colours, but with larger fully painted tiles at intervals. The larger tiles are often shaped as eight-pointed stars, and may show animals or a human head or bust, or plant or other motifs. The geometric patterns, such as modern North African zellige work, made of small tiles each of a single colour but different and regular shapes, are often referred to as "mosaic", which is not strictly correct.

The Mughals made much less use of tiling, preferring (and being able to afford) "parchin kari", a type of pietra dura decoration from inlaid panels of semi-precious stones, with jewels in some cases. This can be seen at the Taj Mahal, Agra Fort and other imperial commissions. The motifs are usually floral, in a simpler and more realistic style than Persian or Turkish work, relating to plants in Mughal miniatures.

Glass 

For most of the Middle Ages Islamic glass was the most sophisticated in Eurasia, exported to both Europe and China. Islam took over much of the traditional glass-producing territory of Sassanian and Ancient Roman glass, and since figurative decoration played a small part in pre-Islamic glass, the change in style is not abrupt, except that the whole area initially formed a political whole, and, for example, Persian innovations were now almost immediately taken up in Egypt. For this reason it is often impossible to distinguish between the various centres of production, of which Egypt, Syria and Persia were the most important, except by scientific analysis of the material, which itself has difficulties. From various documentary references glassmaking and glass trading seems to have been a speciality of the Jewish minority in several centres.

Between the 8th and early 11th centuries the emphasis in luxury glass is on effects achieved by "manipulating the surface" of the glass, initially by incising into the glass on a wheel, and later by cutting away the background to leave a design in relief. The very massive Hedwig glasses, only found in Europe, but normally considered Islamic (or possibly from Muslim craftsmen in Norman Sicily), are an example of this, though puzzlingly late in date. These and other glass pieces probably represented cheaper versions of vessels of carved rock crystal (clear quartz), themselves influenced by earlier glass vessels, and there is some evidence that at this period glass cutting and hardstone carving were regarded as the same craft. From the 12th century the industry in Persia and Mesopotamia appears to decline, and the main production of luxury glass shifts to Egypt and Syria, and decorative effects of colour on smooth surfaced glass. Throughout the period local centres made simpler wares such as Hebron glass in Palestine.

Lustre painting, by techniques similar to lustreware in pottery, dates back to the 8th century in Egypt, and became widespread in the 12th century. Another technique was decoration with threads of glass of a different colour, worked into the main surface, and sometimes manipulated by combing and other effects. Gilded, painted and enamelled glass were added to the repertoire, and shapes and motifs borrowed from other media, such as pottery and metalwork. Some of the finest work was in mosque lamps donated by a ruler or wealthy man. As decoration grew more elaborate, the quality of the basic glass decreased, and it "often has a brownish-yellow tinge, and is rarely free from bubbles". Aleppo seems to have ceased to be a major centre after the Mongol invasion of 1260, and Timur appears to have ended the Syrian industry about 1400 by carrying off the skilled workers to Samarkand. By about 1500 the Venetians were receiving large orders for mosque lamps.

Metalwork 

Medieval Islamic metalwork offers a complete contrast to its European equivalent, which is dominated by modelled figures and brightly coloured decoration in enamel, some pieces entirely in precious metals. In contrast surviving Islamic metalwork consists of practical objects mostly in brass, bronze, and steel, with simple, but often monumental shapes, and surfaces highly decorated with dense decoration in a variety of techniques, but colour mostly restricted to inlays of gold, silver, copper or black niello. The most abundant survivals from medieval periods are fine brass objects, handsome enough to preserve, but not valuable enough to be melted down. The abundant local sources of zinc, compared to tin, explains the rarity of bronze. Household items, such as ewers or water pitchers, were made of one or more pieces of sheet brass, soldered together and subsequently worked and inlaid.

The use of drinking and eating vessels in gold and silver, the ideal in ancient Rome and Persia as well as medieval Christian societies, is prohibited by the Hadiths, as was the wearing of gold rings. Islamic metalworkers shared with their European counterparts a relatively high social status, compared to other artists and craftsmen, and many larger pieces are signed.

Islamic metalwork includes some three-dimensional animal figures, such as fountainheads or aquamaniles, but only one significant enamelled object of Byzantine cloisonné technique is known. The Pisa Griffin is the largest surviving bronze animal, probably from 11th century al-Andaluz. More common objects with elaborate decoration include massive low candlesticks and lamp-stands, lantern lights, bowls, dishes, basins, buckets (these probably for the bath), and ewers, as well as caskets, pen-cases and plaques. Ewers and basins were brought for hand-washing before and after each meal, and so are often lavishly treated display pieces. A typical 13th century ewer from Khorasan is decorated with foliage, animals and the Signs of the Zodiac in silver and copper, and carries a blessing. Specialized objects include knives, arms and armour (always of high interest to the elite) and scientific instruments such as astrolabes, as well as jewellery. Decoration is typically densely packed and very often includes arabesques and calligraphy, sometimes naming an owner and giving a date.

Other applied arts 

High levels of achievement were reached in other materials, including hardstone carvings and jewellery, ivory carving, textiles and leatherwork. During the Middle Ages, Islamic work in these fields was highly valued in other parts of the world and often traded outside the Islamic zone. Apart from miniature painting and calligraphy, other arts of the book are decorative illumination, the only type found in Qur'an manuscripts, and Islamic book covers, which are often highly decorative in luxury manuscripts, using either the geometric motifs found in illumination, or sometimes figurative images probably drawn for the craftsmen by miniature painters. Materials include coloured, tooled and stamped leather and lacquer over paint.

Precious stones 
Egyptian carving of rock crystal into vessels appears in the late 10th century, and virtually disappears after about 1040 C.E.  There are a number of these vessels in the West, which apparently came on the market after the Cairo palace of the Fatimid Caliph was looted by his mercenaries in 1062, and were snapped up by European buyers, mostly ending up in church treasuries. From later periods, especially the hugely wealthy Ottoman and Mughal courts, there are a considerable number of lavish objects carved in semi-precious stones, with little surface decoration, but inset with jewels. Such objects may have been made in earlier periods, but few have survived.

House and furniture 
Older wood carving is typically relief or pierced work on flat objects for architectural use, such as screens, doors, roofs, beams and friezes. An important exception are the complex muqarnas and mocárabe designs giving roofs and other architectural elements a stalactite-like appearance. These are often in wood, sometimes painted on the wood, but often plastered over before painting; the examples at the Alhambra in Granada, Spain are among the best known. Traditional Islamic furniture, except for chests, tended to be covered with cushions, with cupboards rather than cabinets for storage, but there are some pieces, including a low round (strictly twelve-sided) table of about 1560 from the Ottoman court, with marquetry inlays in light wood, and a single huge ceramic tile or plaque on the tabletop. The fine inlays typical of Ottoman court furniture may have developed from styles and techniques used in weapons and musical instruments, for which the finest craftsmanship available was used. There are also intricately decorated caskets and chests from various periods. A spectacular and famous (and far from flat) roof was one of the Islamic components of the 12th century Norman Cappella Palatina in Palermo, which picked from the finest elements of Catholic, Byzantine and Islamic art. Other famous wooden roofs are in the Alhambra in Granada.

Ivory 
Ivory carving centred on the Mediterranean, spreading from Egypt, where a thriving Coptic industry had been inherited; Persian ivory is rare. The normal style was a deep relief with an even surface; some pieces were painted. Spain specialized in caskets and round boxes, which were probably used to keep jewels and perfumes. They were produced mainly in the approximate period of 930–1050, and widely exported. Many pieces are signed and dated, and on court pieces the name of the owner is often inscribed; they were typically gifts from a ruler. As well as a court workshop, Cordoba had commercial workshops producing goods of slightly lower quality. In the 12th and 13th century workshops in Norman Sicily produced caskets, apparently then migrating to Granada and elsewhere after persecution. Egyptian work tended to be in flat panels and friezes, for insertion into woodwork and probably furniture – most are now detached from their settings. Many were calligraphic, and others continued Byzantine traditions of hunting scenes, with backgrounds of arabesques and foliage in both cases.

Silk 
Despite Hadith sayings prohibiting the wearing of silk, the Byzantine and Sassanian traditions of grand figured silk woven cloth continued under Muslim rule. Some designs are calligraphic, especially when made for palls to cover a tomb, but more are surprisingly conservative versions of the earlier traditions, with many large figures of animals, especially majestic symbols of power like the lion and eagle. These are often enclosed in roundels, as found in the pre-Islamic traditions. The majority of early silks have been recovered from tombs, and in Europe reliquaries, where the relics were often wrapped in silk. European clergy and nobility were keen buyers of Islamic silk from an early date and, for example, the body of an early bishop of Toul in France was wrapped in a silk from the Bukhara area in modern Uzbekistan, probably when the body was reburied in 820. The Shroud of St Josse is a famous samite cloth from East Persia, which originally had a carpet-like design with two pairs of confronted elephants, surrounded by borders including rows of camels and an inscription in Kufic script, from which the date appears to be before 961. Other silks were used for clothes, hangings, altarcloths, and church vestments, which have nearly all been lost, except for some vestments.

Ottoman silks were less exported, and the many surviving royal kaftans have simpler geometric patterns, many featuring stylized "tiger-stripes" below three balls or circles. Other silks have foliage designs comparable to those on Iznik pottery or carpets, with bands forming ogival compartments a popular motif. Some designs begin to show Italian influence. By the 16th century Persian silk was using smaller patterns, many of which showed relaxed garden scenes of beautiful boys and girls from the same world as those in contemporary album miniatures, and sometimes identifiable scenes from Persian poetry. A 16th-century circular ceiling for a tent, 97 cm across, shows a continuous and crowded hunting scene; it was apparently looted by the army of Suleiman the Magnificent in his invasion of Persia in 1543–45, before being taken by a Polish general at the Siege of Vienna in 1683. Mughal silks incorporate many Indian elements, and often feature relatively realistic "portraits" of plants, as found in other media.

Indonesian batik

The development and refinement of Indonesian batik cloth was closely linked to Islam. The Islamic prohibition on certain images encouraged batik design to become more abstract and intricate. Realistic depictions of animals and humans are rare on traditional batik. However, mythical serpents, humans with exaggerated features and the Garuda of pre-Islamic mythology are common motifs.

Although its existence pre-dates Islam, batik reached its zenith in royal Muslim courts such as Mataram and Yogyakarta, whose sultans encouraged and patronised batik production. Today, batik is undergoing a revival, and cloths are used for additional purposes such as wrapping the Quran.

History

Beginnings

Pre-dynastic 
The period of a rapid expansion of the Islamic era forms a reasonably accurate beginning for the label of Islamic art. Early geographical boundaries of the Islamic culture were in present-day Syria. It is quite difficult to distinguish the earliest Islamic objects from their predecessors in Persian or Sasanian and Byzantine art, and the conversion of the mass of the population, including artists, took a significant period, sometimes centuries, after the initial spread of Islam. There was, notably, a significant production of unglazed ceramics, witnessed by a famous small bowl preserved in the Louvre, whose inscription assures its attribution to the Islamic period. Plant motifs were the most important in these early productions.

Influences from the Sassanian artistic tradition include the image of the king as a warrior and the lion as a symbol of nobility and virility. Bedouin tribal traditions mixed with the more sophisticated styles of the conquered territories. For an initial period coins had human figures in the Byzantine and Sassanian style, perhaps to reassure users of their continued value, before the Islamic style with lettering only took over.

Umayyad 
Religious and civic architecture were developed under the Umayyad Caliphates (661–750), when new concepts and new plans were put into practice.

The Dome of the Rock in Jerusalem is one of the most important buildings in all of Islamic architecture, marked by a strong Byzantine influence (mosaic against a gold ground, and a central plan that recalls that of the Church of the Holy Sepulchre), but already bearing purely Islamic elements, such as the great epigraphic frieze. The desert palaces in Jordan and Syria (for example, Mshatta, Qusayr 'Amra, and Hisham's Palace) served the caliphs as living quarters, reception halls, and baths, and were decorated, including some wall-paintings, to promote an image of royal luxury.

Work in ceramics was still somewhat primitive and unglazed during this period. Some metal objects have survived from this time, but it remains rather difficult to distinguish these objects from those of the pre-Islamic period.

'Abd al-Malik introduced standard coinage that featured Arabic inscriptions, instead of images of the monarch. The quick development of a localized coinage around the time of the Dome of the Rock's construction demonstrates the reorientation of Umayyad acculturation. This period saw the genesis of a particularly Islamic art.

In this period, Umayyad artists and artisans did not invent a new vocabulary, but began to prefer those received from Mediterranean and Iranian late antiquity, which they adapted to their own artistic conceptions. For example, the mosaics in the Umayyad Mosque of Damascus are based on Byzantine models but replace the figurative elements with images of trees and cities. The desert palaces also bear witness to these influences. By combining the various traditions that they had inherited, and by readapting motifs and architectural elements, artists created little by little a typically Muslim art, particularly discernible in the aesthetic of the arabesque, which appears both on monuments and in illuminated Qurans.

Some Umayyads commissioned erotic art for private settings. The Umayyad caliph Al-Walid II built the Qusayr Amra, as his country retreat, whose decoration includes naked females and love scenes.

Abbasid 

The Abbasid Caliphate (750–1258) witnessed the movement of the capital from Damascus to Baghdad, and then from Baghdad to Samarra. The shift to Baghdad influenced politics, culture, and art. Art historian Robert Hillenbrand (1999) likens the movement to the foundation of an "Islamic Rome", because the meeting of Eastern influences from Iranian, Eurasian steppe, Chinese, and Indian sources created a new paradigm for Islamic art. Classical forms inherited from Byzantine Europe and Greco-Roman sources were discarded in favor of those drawn from the new Islamic hub. Even the design of the city of Baghdad placed it in the "navel of the world", as 9th-century historian al-Ya'qubi wrote.

The ancient city of Baghdad cannot be excavated well, as it lies beneath the modern city. However, Abbasid Samarra, which was largely abandoned, has been well studied, and is known for its surviving examples of stucco reliefs, in which the prehistory of the arabesque can be traced. Motifs known from the stucco at Samarra permit the dating of structures built elsewhere, and are furthermore found on portable objects, particular in wood, from Egypt through to Iran.

Samarra witnessed the "coming of age" of Islamic art. Polychrome painted stucco allowed for experimentation in new styles of moulding and carving. The Abbasid period also coincided with two major innovations in the ceramic arts: the invention of faience, and of metallic lusterware. Hadithic prohibition of the use of golden or silver vessels led to the development of metallic lusterware in pottery, which was made by mixing sulphur and metallic oxides to ochre and vinegar, painted onto an already glazed vessel and then fired a second time. It was expensive, and difficult to manage the second round through the kiln, but the wish to exceed fine Chinese porcelain led to the development of this technique.

Though the common perception of Abbasid artistic production focuses largely on pottery, the greatest development of the Abbasid period was in textiles. Government-run workshops known as tiraz produced silks bearing the name of the monarch, allowing for aristocrats to demonstrate their loyalty to the ruler. Other silks were pictorial. The utility of silk-ware in wall decor, entrance adornment, and room separation was not as important as its cash value along the Silk Road.

Islamic calligraphy began to be used in surface decoration on pottery during this period. Illuminated qur'ans gained attention, letter-forms now more complex and stylized to the point of slowing down the recognition of the words themselves.

Medieval period (9th–15th centuries)
Beginning in the ninth century, Abbasid sovereignty was contested in the provinces furthest removed from the Iraqi center. The creation of an Ismaʻili Shiʻi dynasty, that of the North African Fatimid Caliphate, followed by the Caliphate of Córdoba in the Iberian Peninsula, gave force to this opposition, as well as small dynasties and autonomous governors in Iran.

Spain and the Maghreb

The first Islamic dynasty to establish itself in Iberia, known in Arabic as al-Andalus, was the Umayyads, descended from the great Umayyad Caliphate of Syria. After their fall, they were replaced by various autonomous kingdoms, the taifas (1031–91), but the artistic production from this period does not differ significantly from that of the Umayyads. At the end of the 11th century, two Berber tribes, the Almoravids and the Almohads, captured the head of the Maghreb and Spain, successively, bringing Maghrebi influences into art. A series of military victories by Christian monarchs had reduced Islamic Spain by the end of the 14th century to the city of Granada, ruled by the Nasrid dynasty, who managed to maintain their hold until 1492.

Al-Andalus was a great cultural center of the Middle Ages. Besides the great universities, which taught philosophies and sciences yet unknown in Christendom (such as those of Averroes), the territory was an equally vital center for art.

Many techniques were employed in the manufacture of objects. Ivory was used extensively for the manufacture of boxes and caskets. The pyxis of al-Mughira is a masterwork of the genre. In metalwork, large sculptures in the round, normally rather scarce in the Islamic world, served as elaborate receptacles for water or as fountain spouts. A great number of textiles, most notably silks, were exported: many are found in the church treasuries of Christendom, where they served as covering for saints' reliquaries. From the periods of Maghrebi rule one may also note a taste for painted and sculpted woodwork.

The art of north Africa is not as well studied. The Almoravid and Almohad dynasties are characterized by a tendency toward austerity, for example in mosques with bare walls. Nevertheless, luxury arts continued to be produced in great quantity. The Marinid and Hafsid dynasties developed an important, but poorly understood, architecture, and a significant amount of painted and sculpted woodwork.

Arab Mashriq
The Fatimid Caliphate, which reigned in Egypt from 909 and 1171, introduced crafts and knowledge from politically troubled Baghdad to their capital of Cairo.

By 1070, the Seljuq Empire emerged as the dominant political force in the Muslim world after they liberated Baghdad and defeated the Byzantines at Manzikert. During the rule of Malik-Shah I, the Seljuks excelled in architecture at the same time in Syria, the atabegs (governors of Seljuk princes) assumed power. Quite independent, they capitalized on conflicts with the Frankish crusaders. In 1171, Saladin seized Fatimid Egypt, and installed the transitory Ayyubid dynasty on the throne. This period is notable for innovations in metallurgy and the widespread manufacture of the Damascus steel swords and daggers and the production ceramics, glass and metalwork of a high quality were produced without interruption, and enamelled glass became another important craft.

In 1250, Mamluks seized control of Egypt from the Ayyubids as the Mamluk Sultanate, and by 1261 had managed to assert themselves in Syria as well their most famous ruler was Baibars. The Mamluks were not, strictly speaking, a dynasty, as they did not maintain a patrilineal mode of succession; in fact, Mamluks were freed Turkish and Caucasian slaves, who (in theory) passed the power to others of like station. This mode of government persevered for three centuries, until 1517, and gave rise to abundant architectural projects; many thousands of buildings were constructed during this period. Patronage of luxury arts favored primarily enamelled glass and metalwork and is remembered as the golden age of medieval Egypt. The Baptistère de Saint Louis in the Louvre is an example of the very high quality of metalwork at this period.

Iran and Central Asia

Iran and the north of India, the Tahirids, Samanids, Ghaznavids, and Ghurids struggled for power in the 10th century, and art was a vital element of this competition. Great cities were built, such as Nishapur and Ghazni, and the construction of the Great Mosque of Isfahan (which would continue, in fits and starts, over several centuries) was initiated. Funerary architecture was also cultivated, while potters developed quite individual styles: kaleidoscopic ornament on a yellow ground; or marbled decorations created by allowing colored glazes to run; or painting with multiple layers of slip under the glaze.

The Seljuqs, nomads of Turkic origin from present-day Mongolia, appeared on the stage of Islamic history toward the end of the 10th century. They seized Baghdad in 1048, before dying out in 1194 in Iran, although the production of "Seljuq" works continued through the end of the 12th and beginning of the 13th century under the auspices of smaller, independent sovereigns and patrons. During their time, the center of culture, politics and art production shifted from Damascus and Baghdad to Merv, Nishapur, Rayy, and Isfahan, all in Iran.

Popular patronage expanded because of a growing economy and new urban wealth. Inscriptions in architecture tended to focus more on the patrons of the piece. For example, sultans, viziers or lower ranking officials would receive often mention in inscriptions on mosques.  Meanwhile, growth in mass market production and sale of art made it more commonplace and accessible to merchants and professionals. Because of increased production, many relics have survived from the Seljuk era and can be easily dated. In contrast, the dating of earlier works is more ambiguous. It is, therefore, easy to mistake Seljuk art as new developments rather than inheritance from classical Iranian and Turkic sources.

Innovations in ceramics from this period include the production of minai ware and the manufacture of vessels, not out of clay, but out of a silicon paste ("fritware"), while metalworkers began to encrust bronze with precious metals. Across the Seljuk era, from Iran to Iraq, a unification of book painting can be seen. These paintings have animalistic figures that convey strong symbolic meaning of fidelity, treachery, and courage.

During the 13th century, the Mongols under the leadership of Genghis Khan swept through the Islamic world. After his death, his empire was divided among his sons, forming many dynasties: the Yuan in China, the Ilkhanids in Iran and the Golden Horde in northern Iran and southern Russia.

Ilkhanids
A rich civilization developed under these "little khans", who were originally subservient to the Yuan emperor, but rapidly became independent. Architectural activity intensified as the Mongols became sedentary, and retained traces of their nomadic origins, such as the north–south orientation of the buildings. At the same time a process of "iranisation" took place, and construction according to previously established types, such as the "Iranian plan" mosques, was resumed. The art of the Persian book was also born under this dynasty, and was encouraged by aristocratic patronage of large manuscripts such as the Jami' al-tawarikh by Rashid-al-Din Hamadani. New techniques in ceramics appeared, such as the lajvardina (a variation on luster-ware), and Chinese influence is perceptible in all arts.

The Golden Horde and the Timurids
The early arts of the nomads of the Golden Horde are poorly understood. Research is only beginning, and evidence for town planning and architecture has been discovered. There was also a significant production of works in gold, which often show a strong Chinese influence. Much of this work is preserved today in the Hermitage.

The beginning of the third great period of medieval Iranian art, that of the Timurids, was marked by the invasion of a third group of nomads, under the direction of Timur. During the 15th century this dynasty gave rise to a golden age in Persian manuscript painting, including renowned painters such as Kamāl ud-Dīn Behzād, but also a multitude of workshops and patrons.

Syria, Iraq, Anatolia

The Seljuq Turks pushed beyond Iran into Anatolia, winning a victory over the Byzantine Empire in the Battle of Manzikert (1071), and setting up a sultanate independent of the Iranian branch of the dynasty. Their power seems largely to have waned following the Mongol invasions in 1243, but coins were struck under their name until 1304. Architecture and objects synthesized various styles, both Iranian and Syrian, sometimes rendering precise attributions difficult. The art of woodworking was cultivated, and at least one illustrated manuscript dates to this period.

Caravanserais dotted the major trade routes across the region, placed at intervals of a day's travel. The construction of these caravanserai inns improved in scale, fortification, and replicability. Also, they began to contain central mosques.

The Turkmen were nomads who settled in the area of Lake Van. They were responsible for a number of mosques, such as the Blue Mosque in Tabriz, and they had a decisive influence after the fall of the Anatolian Seljuqs. Starting in the 13th century, Anatolia was dominated by small Turkmen dynasties, which progressively chipped away at Byzantine territory. Little by little a major dynasty emerged, that of the Ottomans, who, after 1450, are referred to as the "first Ottomans". Turkmen artworks can be seen as the forerunners of Ottoman art, in particular the "Milet" ceramics and the first blue-and-white Anatolian works.

Islamic book painting witnessed its first golden age in the thirteenth century, mostly from Syria and Iraq. Influence from Byzantine visual vocabulary (blue and gold coloring, angelic and victorious motifs, symbology of drapery) combined with Mongoloid facial types in 12th-century book frontispieces.

Earlier coinage necessarily featured Arabic epigraphs, but as Ayyubid society became more cosmopolitan and multi-ethnic, coinage began to feature astrological, figural (featuring a variety of Greek, Seleucid, Byzantine, Sasanian, and contemporary Turkish rulers' busts), and animal images.

Hillenbrand suggests that the medieval Islamic texts called Maqamat, copied and illustrated by Yahya ibn Mahmud al-Wasiti were some of the earliest "coffee table books". They were among the first texts to hold up a mirror to daily life in Islamic art, portraying humorous stories and showing little to no inheritance of pictorial tradition.

Indian subcontinent

The Indian subcontinent, some northern parts of which conquered by the Ghaznavids and Ghurids in the 9th century, did not become autonomous until 1206, when the Muizzi, or slave-kings, seized power, marking the birth of the Delhi Sultanate. Later other competing sultanates were founded in Bengal, Kashmir, Gujarat, Jaunpur, Malwa, and in the north Deccan (the Bahmanids). They separated themselves little by little from Persian traditions, giving birth to an original approach to architecture and urbanism, marked in particular by interaction with Hindu art. Study of the production of objects has hardly begun, but a lively art of manuscript illumination is known. The period of the sultanates ended with the arrival of the Mughals, who progressively seized their territories.

The Three Empires

Ottomans 
The Ottoman Empire, whose origins lie in the 14th century, continued in existence until shortly after World War I. This impressive longevity, combined with an immense territory (stretching from Anatolia to Tunisia), led naturally to a vital and distinctive art, including plentiful architecture, mass production of ceramics for both tiles and vessels, most notably Iznik ware, important metalwork and jewellery, Turkish paper marbling Ebru, Turkish carpets as well as tapestries and exceptional Ottoman miniatures and decorative Ottoman illumination.

Masterpieces of Ottoman manuscript illustration include the two "books of festivals" (Surname-I Hümayun), one dating from the end of the 16th century, and the other from the era of Sultan Murad III. These books contain numerous illustrations and exhibit a strong Safavid influence; thus they may have been inspired by books captured in the course of the Ottoman-Safavid wars of the 16th century.

The Ottomans are also known for their development of a bright red pigment, "Iznik red", in ceramics, which reached their height in the 16th century, both in tile-work and pottery, using floral motifs that were considerably transformed from their Chinese and Persian models. From the 18th century, Ottoman art came under considerable European influence, the Turks adopting versions of Rococo which had a lasting and not very beneficial effect, leading to over-fussy decoration. European-style painting was slow to be adopted, with Osman Hamdi Bey (1842-1910) for long a somewhat solitary figure. He was a member of the Ottoman administrative elite who trained in Paris, and painted throughout his long career as a senior administrator and curator in Turkey. Many of his works represent Orientalism from the inside, as it were.

Mughals 
The Mughal Empire in the Indian subcontinent lasted from 1526 until (technically) 1858, although from the late 17th century power flowed away from the emperors to local rulers, and later European powers, above all the British Raj, who were the main power in India by the late 18th century. The period is most notable for luxury arts of the court, and Mughal styles heavily influenced local Hindu and later Sikh rulers as well. The Mughal miniature began by importing Persian artists, especially a group brought back by Humayun when in exile in Safavid Persia, but soon local artists, many Hindu, were trained in the style. Realistic portraiture, and images of animals and plants, was developed in Mughal art beyond what the Persians had so far achieved, and the size of miniatures increased, sometimes onto canvas. The Mughal court had access to European prints and other art, and these had increasing influence, shown in the gradual introduction of aspects of Western graphical perspective, and a wider range of poses in the human figure. Some Western images were directly copied or borrowed from. As the courts of local Nawabs developed, distinct provincial styles with stronger influence from traditional Indian painting developed in both Muslim and Hindu princely courts.

The arts of jewelry and hardstone carving of gemstones, such as jasper, jade, adorned with rubies, diamonds and emeralds are mentioned by the Mughal chronicler Abu'l Fazl, and a range of examples survive; the series of hard stone daggers in the form of horses' heads is particularly impressive.

The Mughals were also fine metallurgists they introduced Damascus steel and refined the locally produced Wootz steel, the Mughals also introduced the "bidri" technique of metalwork in which silver motifs are pressed against a black background. Famous Mughal metallurgists like Ali Kashmiri and Muhammed Salih Thatawi created the seamless celestial globes.

Safavids and Qajars 
The Iranian Safavids, a dynasty stretching from 1501 to 1786, is distinguished from the Mughal and Ottoman Empires, and earlier Persian rulers, in part through the Shi'a faith of its shahs, which they succeeded in making the majority denomination in Persia. Ceramic arts are marked by the strong influence of Chinese porcelain, often executed in blue and white. Architecture flourished, attaining a high point with the building program of Shah Abbas in Isfahan, which included numerous gardens, palaces (such as Ali Qapu), an immense bazaar, and a large imperial mosque.

The art of manuscript illumination also achieved new heights, in particular in the Shah Tahmasp Shahnameh, an immense copy of Ferdowsi's poem containing more than 250 paintings. In the 17th century a new type of painting develops, based around the album (muraqqa). The albums were the creations of connoisseurs who bound together single sheets containing paintings, drawings, or calligraphy by various artists, sometimes excised from earlier books, and other times created as independent works. The paintings of Reza Abbasi figure largely in this new art of the book, depicting one or two larger figures, typically idealized beauties in a garden setting, often using the grisaille techniques previously used for border paintings for the background.

After the fall of the Safavids, the Qajars, a Turkmen tribe established from centuries on the banks of the Caspian Sea, assumed power. Qajar art displays an increasing European influence, as in the large oil paintings portraying the Qajar shahs. Steelwork also assumed a new importance. Like the Ottomans, the Qajar dynasty survived until 1925, a few years after the First World War.

Modern period 

From the 15th century, the number of smaller Islamic courts began to fall, as the Ottoman Empire, and later the Safavids and European powers, swallowed them up; this had an effect on Islamic art, which was usually strongly led by the patronage of the court. From at least the 18th century onwards, elite Islamic art was increasingly influenced by European styles, and in the applied arts either largely adopted Western styles, or ceased to develop, retaining whatever style was prevalent at some point in the late 18th or early 19th centuries. Many industries with very long histories, such as pottery in Iran, largely closed, while others, like metalwork in brass, became generally frozen in style, with much of their production going to tourists or exported as oriental exotica.

The carpet industry has remained large, but mostly uses designs that originated before 1700, and competes with machine-made imitations both locally and around the world. Arts and crafts with a broader social base, like the zellige mosaic tiles of the Maghreb, have often survived better. Islamic countries have developed modern and contemporary art, with very vigorous art scenes, but the degree to which these should be grouped in a special category as "Islamic art" is questionable, although many artists deal with Islam-related themes, and use traditional elements such as calligraphy. Further, much modern architecture and interior decoration in the Islamic world makes use of motifs and elements drawn from the heritage of Islamic art.

See also 
 Islamic culture
 Arabic miniature 
 Islamic graffiti
 List of museums of Islamic art
 Siyah Qalam

Notes

References 

Books and journals
"Arts": Jones, Dalu & Michell, George, (eds); The Arts of Islam, Arts Council of Great Britain, 1976, 

Blair, S. Bloom, J. 'The Mirage of Islamic Art: Reflections on the Study of an Unwieldy Field'. The Art Bulletin, 2003, 85, 1, 152–184, PDF
Bloom, Sheila and Jonathan, eds., Rivers of Paradise: Water in Islamic Art and Culture, Yale University Press, 2009.
Canby, Sheila R. (ed). Shah Abbas; The Remaking of Iran, 2009, British Museum Press, 

King, Donald and Sylvester, David eds. The Eastern Carpet in the Western World, From the 15th to the 17th century, Arts Council of Great Britain, London, 1983, 
Hillenbrand, Robert. Islamic Art and Architecture, Thames & Hudson World of Art series; 1999, London. 
Levey, Michael; The World of Ottoman Art, 1975, Thames & Hudson, 

Rawson, Jessica, Chinese Ornament: The lotus and the dragon, 1984, British Museum Publications, 
Rogers J.M. and Ward R.M.; Süleyman the Magnificent, 1988, British Museum Publications 
Savage, George. Porcelain Through the Ages, Penguin, (2nd edn.) 1963
Shaw, Wendy. "Islam and Art: An Overview." Oxford Research Encyclopedia of Religion. 
Sinclair, Susan. Bibliography of Art and Architecture in the Islamic World. Volume 1: Art. 2012, BRILL

Further reading 

Darwish, Ali (1984). The arts in Afro-Arab relations: the legacy of Islam in architecture and  sculpture. Historical and socio-cultural relations between black Africa and the Arab world from 1935 to the present. UNESCO (ed.) The general history of Africa: studies and documents, no 7. 207 p.

External links 

 ARCHNET: Islamic Architecture Community: Extensive archive of scholarly articles, full publications and pictures
 Museum With No Frontiers: extensive site on Islamic art
 Victoria & Albert Museum: Islamic Middle East Collections including contemporary pieces
 Museum of Islamic Art, Doha, Qatar:
 MATHAF: Arab Museum of Modern Art Qatar
 CalligraphyIslamic: Extensive site on Islamic calligraphy
 Palace and Mosque: Islamic Art from the Victoria and Albert Museum at the National Gallery of Art, Washington
 Artistic Exchange: Europe and the Islamic World Selections from the Permanent Collection at the National Gallery of Art
 Islamic Art Network – Thesaurus Islamicus Foundation
 Islamic Arts & Architecture
 Islamic Art in Modern Architecture
 The Kirkor Minassian Collection at the Library of Congress has decorative Islamic book bindings.

 
Visual arts genres
Articles containing video clips